is a Japanese manga series written and illustrated by A-10. It was serialized in Kodansha's shōnen manga magazine Bessatsu Shōnen Magazine from September 2018 to November 2020, with its chapters collected in five tankōbon volumes.

Publication
Written and illustrated by A-10, Aka no Grimoire was serialized in Kodansha's shōnen manga magazine Bessatsu Shōnen Magazine from September 7, 2018, to November 9, 2020. Kodansha collected its chapters in five tankōbon volumes, released from February 8, 2019, to January 8, 2021.

Volume list

References

External links
 

Dark fantasy anime and manga
Kodansha manga
Shōnen manga